The two fontane dei mostri marini ("sea monster fountains") are located in the Santissima Annunziata plaza in the Italian city of Florence.

History
The two fountains were placed in 1641 at the sides of the Santissima Annunziata plaza, having been commissioned in 1626. The statues were originally intended to complement the Monument of the Four Moors in Livorno. To this end, artist Pietro Tacca began to work on them in 1627 with the help of two students: Bartolomeo Salvini and Francesco Maria Bandini.

In 1641, following the death of Tacca, the fountains were placed in the Santissima Annunziata plaza on opposite sides of the Equestrian Monument of Ferdinando I.

The fountains were restored over a period spanning from 1987 to 1988, and again between May and June 1996 by Giovanni Morigi under the direction of the Carlo Francini Office of Fine Arts of the City of Florence. Despite these efforts, the statues again began to show signs of material degradation and the fountains were eventually shut down. In 2013, money obtained by the Municipality of Public Land Concession for Special Initiatives was used to initiate a new restorative effort.

Description
These two fountains are considered masterpieces among Mannerist sculptures for their beauty and balance, using contemporary marine symbology (such as seashells, fish, legendary monsters, garlands of shellfish and algae, and masks) alongside traditional maritime themes and symbols. As emphasized, for example, by Giuseppe Richa in Notizie Istoriche delle chiese fiorentine (XVIII secolo), it was unconventional that sprays of water would not be directed upwards, but sometimes come out from mouths of the monsters directed downwards.

Pietro Tacca's signature (PETRUS TACC F.) can be found on both fountains; this is most easily read with one's back to the basilica.

Gallery

See also
Pietro Tacca
Equestrian Monument of Cosimo I (Florence)
Equestrian Monument of Ferdinando I (Florence)
Monument of the Four Moors (Livorno)

References
 Le bellezze della città di Firenze, dove a pieno di pittura, di scultura, di sacri templi, di palazzi, i più notabili artifizi, e più preziosi si contengono, scritte già da M. Francesco Bocchi, ed ora da M. Giovanni Cinelli ampliate, ed accresciute, Firenze, per Gio. Gugliantini, 1677, p. 415;
 Giuseppe Zocchi, Scelta di XXIV vedute delle principali Contrade, Piazze, Chiese e Palazzi della Città di Firenze, Firenze, appresso Giuseppe Allegrini, 1744, tav. XV;
 Federico Fantozzi, Nuova guida ovvero descrizione storico artistico critica della città e contorni di Firenze, Firenze, Giuseppe e fratelli Ducci, 1842, p. 404;
 Federico Fantozzi, Pianta geometrica della città di Firenze alla proporzione di 1 a 4500 levata dal vero e corredata di storiche annotazioni, Firenze, Galileiana, 1843, p. 179, n. 427;
 Giuseppe Formigli, Guida per la città di Firenze e suoi contorni, nuova edizione corretta ed accresciuta, Firenze, Carini e Formigli, 1849, p. 72;
 Augusto Garneri, Firenze e dintorni: in giro con un artista. Guida ricordo pratica storica critica, Torino et alt., Paravia & C., s.d. ma 1924, p. 205, n. X;
 Luigi Vittorio Bertarelli, Firenze e dintorni, Milano, Touring Club Italiano, 1937, p. 193;
 Ettore Allodoli, Arturo Jahn Rusconi, Firenze e dintorni, Roma, Istituto Poligrafico e Libreria dello Stato, 1950, p. 131;
 Eve Borsook, Ecco Firenze. Guida ai luoghi e nel tempo, edizione italiana a cura di Piero Bertolucci, Milano, Mursia, 1972 (ed or. The Companion Guide to Florence, London, Collins, 1966), p. 227;
 Touring Club Italiano, Firenze e dintorni, Milano, Touring Editore, 1974, p. 211;
 Giuseppe Zocchi, Vedute di Firenze e della Toscana, a cura di Rainer Michael Mason, Firenze, Libreria Editrice Fiorentina, 1981, pp. 60–61;
 Carlo Cresti, Le fontane di Firenze, Firenze, Bonechi, 1982, pp. 56–61;
 Piero Torriti, Pietro Tacca da Carrara, Genova, Sagep, 1984, pp. 39–44;
 Carlo Francini, Le fontane del Tacca, il giardino di Palazzo Grifoni e una pianta delle scuderie di San Marco, in "Bollettino della Società di Studi Fiorentini", 1997, 1, pp. 67–75;
 Touring Club Italiano, Firenze e provincia, Milano, Touring Editore, 2005, p. 331.
 Luciano Artusi, Tante le acque che scorrevano a Firenze, itinarario tra i giochi d'acqua delle decorative fontane fiorentine, Semper, Firenze 2005.
 Elisabetta Nardinocchi, Pietro Tacca tra natura e decoro, in Pietro Tacca. Carrara, la Toscana, le grandi corti europee, catalogo della mostra (Carrara, Centro Internazionale delle Arti Plastiche, 5 maggio-19 agosto 2007) a cura di Franca Falletti, Firenze, Mandragora, 2007, pp. 102–119.

External links

Claudio Paolini, scheda nel Repertorio delle architetture civili di Firenze di Palazzo Spinelli (testi concessi in GFDL).

Fountains in Florence
Animal sculptures
Bronze sculptures in Florence
Florence
Mannerist architecture in Italy
Fish in art
Seashells in art